The George McGregor Cabin on the Yukon River, about two miles downstream from Coal Creek, in the Yukon-Charley Rivers National Preserve of Alaska is a historic Log cabin built in 1938 that was listed on the U.S. National Register of Historic Places in 1987.

George McGregor was a successful gold miner, who staked multiple gold claims including the "discovery claim" on Mineral Creek, a tributary of Woodchopper Creek, which he worked for about 10 years and then sold these in the mid-1930s.  Then he switched to trapping for furs;  in 1938 he built this cabin and developed a trapline.  As the trapline would be operated in the winter, by dogsled visits, he fished in the summer for food for his dogs using a fishwheel.  The cabin is a one-roomed saddle-notched log cabin which is representative of what trappers used.

See also
National Register of Historic Places listings in Yukon-Charley Rivers National Preserve
National Register of Historic Places listings in Yukon–Koyukuk Census Area, Alaska

References

External links

1938 establishments in Alaska
National Register of Historic Places in Yukon-Charley Rivers National Preserve
Houses completed in 1938
Houses in Unorganized Borough, Alaska
Houses on the National Register of Historic Places in Alaska
Log cabins in the United States
Yukon River
Buildings and structures on the National Register of Historic Places in Yukon–Koyukuk Census Area, Alaska
Log buildings and structures on the National Register of Historic Places in Alaska